Treveor is a hamlet west of Gorran Haven, Cornwall, England, United Kingdom.

References

Hamlets in Cornwall